Ángel Betular (1891 – 3 June 1938) was an Argentine football player. Betular spent his entire career in Racing Club de Avellaneda, where he played as defender. Betular won 12 titles playing for Racing, including two international cups.

Career 

Born in Buenos Aires, Betular began his player career in Racing Club. He had an elegant style of playing, combined with a fierce defense and a long-distance shooting that allowed him to score many goals. Moreover, he usually shot penalties and free kicks for his team.

In 1910 Racing won the Segunda División final against Boca Juniors, gaining promotion to the top-flight division, Primera División, with Betular being part of the winning team. Betular won several titles with Racing, playing along with notable footballers such as Zoilo Canavery, Alberto Ohaco and Alberto Marcovecchio.

In 1914 Betular played for Racing an international friendly match against Torino Football Club, with a score 1-0 for The Academy.

Titles 
 Primera División (5): 1913, 1914, 1915, 1916, 1917
 Copa de Honor Municipalidad de Buenos Aires (2): 1913, 1915
 Copa Ibarguren (3): 1913, 1914, 1916
 Copa de Honor Cousenier (1): 1913
 Copa Aldao (1): 1917

References 

Argentine footballers
Footballers from Buenos Aires
Racing Club de Avellaneda footballers
Argentine people of Spanish descent
1891 births
1938 deaths
Argentine people of Basque descent
Association football defenders